United Nations Security Council Resolution 24, adopted on April 30, 1947, recommended Hungary's application for admission to the United Nations to the Committee on the Admission of New Members for "study and report to the Security Council at the appropriate time".

The resolution was adopted by 10 votes in favour, while Australia abstained. Hungary would later be admitted as a full UN member at SCR 109 in 1955.

See also
 List of United Nations Security Council Resolutions 1 to 100 (1946–1953)

References
Text of the Resolution at undocs.org

External links
 

 0024
 0024
1947 in Hungary
 0024
April 1947 events